Phil Price (born 10 November 1988) is a Welsh rugby union player. A prop forward, he has represented Wales at Under 18 and Under 19 levels.

Price previously played for Bridgend RFC, Bedwas RFC, and the Ospreys Under-18 and Under-20 regional teams.

Price subsequently joined the Dragons and made his debut versus Glasgow on 16 October 2009.

Price was released by the Dragons at the end of the 2017–18 season and joined the Scarlets.

References

External links
Dragons profile

Rugby union players from Bridgend
Welsh rugby union players
Dragons RFC players
Bedwas RFC players
1988 births
Living people
Scarlets players
Rugby union props